Yommarat railway halt is a railway halt in Bangkok. It is owned and operated by State Railway of Thailand and serves the Northern, Northeastern and Southern Line. It is on Sawankhalok Road in Thung Phaya Thai, Ratchathewi District, Bangkok, to the north of Yommarat level-crossing. The trains that stop at this station are only commuter services and some ordinary services. Yommarat was refurbished since 2017 and was used as an access point for railway passengers to the Royal Crematorium during the death and funeral of King Bhumibol Adulyadej.

It will be relocated a bit further north to service the SRT Red Lines Project and handle trains coming from Phaya Thai.

External links
 
 

Railway stations in Bangkok
Buildings and structures in Bangkok